Epomops is a genus of bat in the family Pteropodidae. It contains the following species:
 Buettikofer's epauletted fruit bat, Epomops buettikoferi
 Franquet's epauletted fruit bat, Epomops franqueti

References

 
Bat genera
Taxa named by John Edward Gray
Taxonomy articles created by Polbot